Louis of Lorraine (Louis de Lorraine) may refer to:

Louis of Lower Lorraine (980–1012)
Louis, Count of Vaudémont (1500–1528)
Louis I, Cardinal of Guise (1527–1578)
Louis II, Cardinal of Guise (1555–1588)
Louis III, Cardinal of Guise (1575–1621)
Louis Joseph de Lorraine, Duke of Guise (1650–1671)
Louis, Count of Armagnac (1641–1718)
Louis, Duke of Joyeuse (1662–1654) 
Louis, Prince of Lambesc (1692–1743)
Louis, Prince of Brionne (1725–1761)